People, places, and things commonly known as the Black Stream or a black stream include:
 the black stream glider, a species of dragonfly
 the Kuroshio Current
 in dowsing, a purported cause of Earth radiation resulting in negative effects.
 forms of illegal downloading.
 The Gaelic term for black stream is believed to be the origin of the surname Douglas
 Black stream